is a Japanese manga artist best known for his manga series Detective Conan (1994–present), also known as Case Closed in some English-speaking countries. As of 2017, his various manga series had a combined 250 million copies in print worldwide.

Educational background 
Aoyama was talented in drawing even at an early age. In elementary school, his painting of "Yukiai War" won a competition and was displayed at the Tottori Daimaru Department Store. He has an older brother who is a scientist and helps him out with the "gimmicks" in Detective Conan. He has another brother who is a doctor.

Aoyama graduated from Yuraikuei High School, before going on to study at Nihon University College of Art in Tokyo. In winter of 1986, Aoyama won a comic contest for freshmen students. When he was an art student, Aoyama had a part-time job working at Tokyo Disneyland, where he painted backgrounds for Pirates of the Caribbean.

Career 
Aoyama made his debut as a manga artist with Chotto Mattete, which was published in the magazine Weekly Shōnen Sunday in winter of 1987. Shortly after that, he began Magic Kaito in the same magazine. Magic Kaito protagonist Kaito Kuroba later appeared in Case Closed.

Between 1988 and 1993, Aoyama created the series Yaiba, which ran for 24 volumes. Later, he would release other manga series in single volumes, such as Third Baseman No.4 and Gosho Aoyama's Collection of Short Stories.

Aoyama began serializing Detective Conan in Weekly Shōnen Sunday on January 19, 1994. When the series was first released in English, it was given the title Case Closed.

Awards and recognition 

Aoyama has won two awards for his work as a manga artist. In 1992, he won the Shogakukan Manga Award for shōnen for Yaiba. He would go on to win the same award for a second time in 2001, this time for Detective Conan.

Additionally, his hometown Hokuei has undertaken several machi okoshi (town revitalization) projects in honor of his contribution as a manga artist and resident. The first projects were the Conan Bridge across the Yura River and Detective Conan statues. On March 18, 2007, the Gosho Aoyama Manga Factory, a museum that celebrates Aoyama's career as a manga artist, was opened.

Personal life 
On May 5, 2005, Aoyama married Minami Takayama, the singer of Two-Mix and voice actress for Conan in the anime adaptation of Detective Conan. On December 10, 2007, the two divorced.

Manga works 
 (1987)
The story of a boy genius named Yutaka Takai, whose time machine jetpack sends his love interest through time for two years.

 (1987–present)
A five-volume manga series that tells the adventures of Kaito Kid, a mysterious gentleman thief who uses his skills as illusionist and master of disguise to commit robberies; his secret identity is that of high school student Kaito Kuroba. The first two volumes of the manga series were released in 1988, the third in 1994, the fourth in 2007, and the fifth in 2017. Although the series is currently on hiatus, Kaito Kid still appears regularly in Detective Conan.

Yaiba (1988–1993)
A 24-volume manga series about the adventures of a young samurai named Yaiba Kurogane. It was adapted into a 52-episode anime series which aired between 1993 and 1994.

 (1991–1993)
A one-volume manga that tells the story of a boy named Shigeo Nagashima, a mediocre baseball player on his high school team. One day, he buys a magical bat from a sporting goods store that allows him to hit every pitch. However, he has to pay the mysterious store for each pitch he hits.

Various short works written over the years:

 
Ongoing  series that tells the story of genius high school detective Shinichi Kudo, who one day is turned into a child by mysterious men and assumes the alias of Conan Edogawa. While trying to track down these men, he often encounters complicated mysteries, most of which only he can solve. This series is Aoyama's most well-known creation, and has been collected in 102 volumes as of September 15, 2022.

 (2007)
A one-shot about a girl named , who can read people's minds when she looks them in the eyes.

References

External links 

 Gosho Aoyama Manga Factory (Official English website)

 
1963 births
Living people
Japanese animated film producers
Japanese anime producers
Japanese mystery writers
Japanese writers
Nihon University alumni
Manga artists from Tottori Prefecture